is a Japanese child actress and tarento. She is best known for her work in Saya Zamurai, for which she won a Newcomer of the Year Award at the 35th Japan Academy Prize ceremony.

Her sister is child actress Koko Kumada.

Biography
Sea Kumada was born July 18, 2001 in Tokyo, Japan.

For the 2011 movie Saya Zamurai, directed by Hitoshi Matsumoto, she received one of the seven Newcomer of the Year awards at the 35th Japan Academy Prize ceremony.

Filmography

Films 
  (2009, Toho) - Mayu Taneda (as a child)
  (2009, Toho) - Hikari Sakurai (as a child)
 Paradise Kiss (2011, Warner Bros.) - Yukari Hayasaka (as a child)
  (2011, Shochiku) - Tae

Animation films
 Pretty Cure All Stars New Stage: Friends of the Future (2012, Toei) – Fū-chan (voice)

Television dramas
  (April 13 - June 22, 2007, Fuji TV)
 Ryūsei no Kizuna (October 17 - December 19, 2008, TBS) - young Shizuna
 Orthros no Inu (July 24 - September 25, 2009, TBS) - Rei Hasebe
  (August 28, 2009, Fuji TV) - Marina Suzuki
 Kamen Rider W episode 27, "The D Was Watching/The Transparent Magical Lady" (March 21, 2010, TV Asahi) - young Lily Shirogane
  (April 22 - June 17, 2010, TV Asahi) - Mana Nishikawa
  episode 5 (February 27, 2011, TV Asahi) - Yui
 Mito Kōmon series 43, episode 3,  (July 18, 2011, TBS) - Okoma
  (August 26, 2011, NTV) - Nozomi Izawa
  (October 27 - December 22, 2011, TBS) - Sakura Miyamoto
 Miyabe Miyuki Mystery - Perfect Blue episode 8 (November 26, 2012, TBS) - young Akie Asō
  episodes 5-6 (May 13/20, 2013, TBS) - Haruna Shimizu
  (October 11, 2013, Fuji TV) - Miyuki Inafuku (Miyuki Shimabukuro)
  episode 6 (May 19, 2014, TBS) - Haruka Okunuki

Other television
 Sore Ike! Anpanman Club (2007-2008, BS Nitere) - self
  (2008, NHK) - self
  (2008, NTV)

Awards 
 35th Japan Academy Prize (2012) — Newcomer of the Year

References

External links 
 Official blog
 
 

2001 births
Living people
Japanese child actresses
Japanese television personalities
People from Tokyo
21st-century Japanese actresses